Ottawa Sports and Entertainment Group (OSEG) is a professional sports and commercial real estate management group based in Ottawa, Ontario, Canada. The primary holdings of the company are a pair of professional sports franchises: the Ottawa Redblacks of the Canadian Football League and the Ottawa 67's of the Ontario Hockey League. OSEG owned Ottawa Fury FC of the North American Soccer League and USL Championship until said team was dissolved in November of 2019. In addition to its sports franchises, OSEG operates facilities at Lansdowne Park associated with these teams, which are owned by the city of Ottawa: TD Place Stadium, TD Place Arena, and other facilities. It was formed as a partnership between private partners and the city of Ottawa in 2009 initially to revive Ottawa's CFL franchise after the demise of franchise's previous incarnation, the Ottawa Renegades, and including a revitalization of the Lansdowne Park area.

References

Sport in Ottawa
Sports management companies
Ottawa Fury FC
Ice hockey in Ottawa
Ottawa Redblacks
Companies based in Ottawa
Canadian companies established in 2009
Entertainment companies established in 2009
2009 establishments in Ontario